Chester Mortimer Franklin (September 1, 1889 – March 12, 1954) was an American film director and actor active mainly in the silent era. Born in San Francisco, he was the brother of Sidney A. Franklin. In the late 1910s, he co-directed with his brother Sidney several films with all-children casts for William Fox. He directed two silent horror films, the 1924 Behind the Curtain (a.k.a. Souls Which Pass in the Night) and the 1927 The Thirteenth Hour.

Partial filmography

 Going Straight (1916)
 Gretchen the Greenhorn (1916)
 The Little School Ma'am (1916)
 The Babes in the Woods (1917)
 Jack and the Beanstalk (1917)
 Treasure Island (1918)
 You Never Can Tell (1920)
 All Soul's Eve (1921)
 The Case of Becky (1921)
 Nancy from Nowhere (1922)
 A Game Chicken (1922)
 The Toll of the Sea (1922)
 Where the North Begins (1923)
 The Song of Love (1923)
 Behind the Curtain (1924) a.k.a. Souls Which Pass in the Night
 The Thirteenth Hour (1927)
 Detectives (1928)
 Vanity Fair (1932)
 File 113 (1933)
 Sequoia (1934)
 Tough Guy (1936)

References

External links

1889 births
1954 deaths
Film directors from California
Male actors from San Francisco
20th-century American male actors
American male silent film actors
Burials at Forest Lawn Memorial Park (Glendale)